Karisalkalampatti is a village in Near sivarakkottai NH7 Main road Thirumangalam Taluk in Madurai District of the Indian state of Tamil Nadu. It is located about 9 km from Thirumangalam, 30 km from Madurai and 520 km from State capital Chennai. As of 2011, the village population about 1158.

Geography 
The latitude and longitude of this village is 9°76’ N and 77°96’E respectively and the mean sea level (MSL) is 121m. This village is situated on the banks of river Gundar, a distributary of the river Vaigai. The average maximum and minimum temperatures are of 40 °C and 27 °C. This village gets major rainfall during the south west monsoon period. The average annual rainfall received in the village is 40.95 cm.

Demographics 
According to 2011 census, Karisalkalampatti had population of 1158, 589 male and 569 female for a sex-ratio of 966 females for every 1,000 males, which is lower than Tamil Nadu state average of 996. 142 were under the age of six. Schedule Caste accounted about 39 and there were no Scheduled Tribes.  The average literacy of the village was 71.06%, compared to national average of 72.99%. The village had a total of 326 households. There were 683 workers, including 88 cultivators and 379 agricultural laborers. According to the religious census of 2011, Karisalkalampatti had 99% Hindus and 1% christians three castes thevar 48℅ vadugan 50℅ thalith 2%

Politics 
As per the constitution of India and Panchyati Raaj Act, Karisalkalampatti village is administrated by Sarpanch (Head of Village) who is elected representative of village. Karisalkalampatti village falls under Tirumangalam assembly constituency is part of Virudhunagar (Lok Sabha constituency).

Economy 
Surrounding cultivate lands are the main places for the agricultural activities. Crops like cotton, rice, cholam, kambu and green dal are cultivated here.

Educational institutions 
P.U.M.S which provides primary education to students.  Of kothari publishe school sivarakottai located on NH-7 Madurai Highway Road, yet to be opened. Dr. M.S. Udayamurthy Teacher Training Institute(Venkatachalampuram Pullambady Thirumalapady Rd Trichy) which act as a training institute to nearby villages.

Transportation 

Regular bus services are operated on daily basis from Tirumangalam and Madurai. Also auto services available from sivarakottai.  Nearest Airport is Madurai International Airport just 15 km from the Village.

Surrounding areas 
Sengapadai (3 km), Sivarakkottai (4 km), Rayapalayam (4 km), Puliampatty (5 km), T. Pudupatty (6 km) are the nearby Villages to Karisalkalampatti. Karisalkalampatti is surrounded by Tirumangalam Taluk towards North, T.Kallupatti Taluk towards west, Kariapatti Taluk towards East, Chellampatti Taluk towards South.

Climate
Karisalkallampatti has a tropical wet and dry climate (Köppen: Aw). The village gets most of its seasonal rainfall from the northeast monsoon winds, from mid–October to mid–December. Prevailing winds in this are usually southwesterly between April and October and north-easterly during the rest of the year. Historically, karisalkalampatti has relied on the annual rains of the monsoon season to replenish water reservoirs, as no major rivers flow through the area.

References

External links
Karisalkalampatti, Madurai District

Villages in Madurai district